Spektens Gränd is an alley in Gamla stan, the old town of Stockholm, Sweden. Located just west of Storkyrkan church, it connects the streets Trångsund and Prästgatan. It runs parallel to Storkyrkobrinken, Ankargränd, Solgränd and Kåkbrinken streets.

The alley was created when the block between Ankargränd and Kåkbrinken was split in two in 1675. One of the houses built at the time was sold to the merchant Gert Specht in 1685, from whom the alley got its unintelligible name. A Gert Specht is mentioned in the records as being a resident of Norrmalm in 1594. He was probably the father or grandfather of the former.

In the alley are two small courtyards. One featuring cast iron decorations, including a lion head, a fence decorated with the star of David, and a small gate flanked by two lampposts. The other has a portal with the inscription ISSH MDP 1667.

See also 
 List of streets and squares in Gamla stan

References

External links 
 Stockholmskällan - Historical photos
 hitta.se - Location map and virtual walk
 Stockholm City Archive - A brief article on the building in the northern corner between Prästgatan and Spektens Gränd. 

Streets in Stockholm